Xyris platylepis, the tall yelloweyed grass, is a North American species of flowering plants in the yellow-eyed-grass family. It grows on the coastal plain of the southeastern and south-central United States from eastern Texas to Virginia.

Xyris platylepis  is a perennial herb up to 10 cm (4 inches) tall with long, narrow leaves up to 50 cm (20 inches) long.

References

External links
Photo of herbarium specimen at Missouri Botanical Garden collected in Alabama in 1981

platylepis
Plants described in 1860
Flora of the United States
Taxa named by Alvan Wentworth Chapman